Fabio Anobile (born 16 December 1993) is an Italian paralympic cyclist who won a bronze medal at the 2016 Summer Paralympics.

References

External links
 

1993 births
Living people
Paralympic cyclists of Italy
Paralympic bronze medalists for Italy
Medalists at the 2016 Summer Paralympics
Paralympic medalists in cycling
Cyclists at the 2016 Summer Paralympics
Cyclists at the 2020 Summer Paralympics
Paralympic athletes of Fiamme Azzurre
People from Saronno
Sportspeople from the Province of Varese